Keon Kelly Daniel (born 16 January 1987 in Lambeau) is a Trinidadian professional footballer who most recently played for Polish side GKS Tychy.

Career

Club
Daniel attended Signal Hill Secondary School in his native Tobago, and later attended the St Clair Coaching School. After a two-week trial with Manchester United in 2005 Daniel turned professional when he signed with United Petrotrin of the TT Pro League in 2006.

After another trial in England in August 2008, this time with West Ham United, Daniel joined league rivals Caledonia AIA in 2009.

In May 2010 Daniel transferred to the Puerto Rico Islanders of the USSF D2 Pro League. He made his debut for the Islanders on 26 June 2010 as a substitute in a 3–0 loss to the Rochester Rhinos.

Prior to the 2011 Major League Soccer season, Daniel trialed with the Philadelphia Union. Following the successful trial, Daniel signed with the Union on 18 March 2011. In Week 7 of the season, Daniel was named to the MLS Team of the Week for his performance against the San Jose Earthquakes. His first goal for Philadelphia was scored on 11 June 2011 in an MLS game against Real Salt Lake.

After temporarily leaving Philadelphia to play for the Trinidad and Tobago national football team in September 2011, Daniel was forced to remain in Trinidad and Tobago due to an expired visa until February 2012. This incident spawned the "Free Keon" meme used amongst Philadelphia Union fans at live matches and online social networking groups.

Miedź Legnica
It was announce that Keon Daniel would join Miedź Legnica  in the I liga (Poland) from Philadelphia Union in 2014.

International
Daniel made his debut for the Trinidad and Tobago national football team in 2007. He scored his first senior international goal against Guyana in January 2008 and his second against El Salvador in March 2008, both from free kicks. He was also part of the Trinidad & Tobago squads which competed in the Caribbean Cup in 2008, 2010, and 2012. He was also part of the squads for the multiple CONCACAF Gold Cups, as well as 2010 FIFA World Cup qualification, and 2014 FIFA World Cup qualification. In total, Daniel has made 57 international appearances and scored 14 goals.

International goals 
Scores and results list Trinidad and Tobago's goal tally first.

Career statistics

Club

Updated 3 August 2013

International

Statistics accurate as of 9 July 2013

Personal
Daniel's nickname is "Schillaci", after the famous Italian striker Salvatore Schillaci.

Honors

Puerto Rico Islanders
 USSF Division 2 Pro League Champions: 2010

References

External links
 Keon Daniel Profile at the Socawarriors.net website
 socawarriors.net
 

1987 births
Living people
Association football midfielders
Trinidad and Tobago footballers
Trinidad and Tobago international footballers
United Petrotrin F.C. players
TT Pro League players
Morvant Caledonia United players
Puerto Rico Islanders players
Philadelphia Union players
Miedź Legnica players
Flota Świnoujście players
GKS Tychy players
USSF Division 2 Professional League players
Major League Soccer players
I liga players
III liga players
Trinidad and Tobago expatriate footballers
Expatriate footballers in Poland
Expatriate footballers in Puerto Rico
Expatriate soccer players in the United States
Trinidad and Tobago expatriate sportspeople in Poland
Trinidad and Tobago expatriate sportspeople in Puerto Rico
Trinidad and Tobago expatriate sportspeople in the United States
2007 CONCACAF Gold Cup players
2013 CONCACAF Gold Cup players